Fernando Aurelio Román Villalba (born 20 November 1998) is a Paraguayan professional footballer who plays as a left-back for Aldosivi.

Career
Román played for the Escuela de Fútbol Pastoreo in his early years, prior to heading to Libertad. He made the breakthrough into senior football during the 2017 campaign, making first-team appearances in September against Sportivo Trinidense and Nacional. Those were his only matches, with a move to fellow Primera División team Cerro Porteño following in June 2018. Two years later, having only featured in the Copa Paraguay, Román headed off to Argentina after agreeing terms with Aldosivi on 29 September 2020; having trained there since the start of the year. He made his debut on 14 November against San Lorenzo.

Career statistics
.

Notes

References

External links

1998 births
Living people
People from Ñemby
Paraguayan footballers
Association football defenders
Paraguayan expatriate footballers
Expatriate footballers in Argentina
Paraguayan expatriate sportspeople in Argentina
Aldosivi footballers